Ryu Hyo-young  (born April 22, 1993), better known by the mononym Hyoyoung or Jung Woo-yeon, is a South Korean actress, model, and rapper. She was a member of the South Korean co-ed group Coed School and the girl group F-ve Dolls.

Biography 
Ryu was born on 22 April 1993 in Gwangju, South Korea. She has an identical twin sister, Ryu Hwa-young, who is a former member of the girl group T-ara. Hyoyoung is the older of the two.

Ryu was scouted after she and her sister made an appearance on SBS' variety show Star King by Core Contents Media. Ryu and her sister were both originally slated to debut in T-ara, however, Ryu was cut from the group's line-up before their debut. A year later, she  debuted with Coed School.

Career

2010–15: Debut and acting debut 

Ryu made her debut as a member of Coed School in 2010. The group debuted on September 30, 2010. The group was later separated into a female unit and a male unit.

In that same year, Ryu was cast in KBS' teen drama Jungle Fish 2. She also took part in the 80th Miss Chunhyang pageant and subsequently won it.

In 2011, Ryu joined Coed School's female unit, F-ve Dolls. The unit made their debut on February 17. The unit later became an independent group after her agency decided not to reform Coed School. The same year, she starred in MBC's romantic comedy drama The Greatest Love playing a popular singer.

In October 2012, Ryu was cast in KBS' teen drama School 2013. She next starred in weekend drama 12 Years Promise, and the 100-episode daily drama Family Secret.

On March 10, 2015 MBK Entertainment confirmed that F-ve Dolls had decided to disband. In August 2015, following F-ve Dolls' disbandment, it was reported that Ryu had requested to terminate her contract with MBK Entertainment.

2016–present: Acting career 
In March 2016, it was confirmed that her request to terminate her contract with MBK Entertainment was accepted. Ryu later signed an exclusive contract with Y Team Company in August 2017. The same year, she was cast as the lead role in MBC's daily drama Golden Pouch.

In 2018, Ryu was cast in the historical TV series Grand Prince. The series achieved a rating of 5.6% for its finale, becoming the highest rated TV Chosun series since the network's establishment in 2011.

She was cast as female lead in weekend series Be Meal under the new stage name Jung Woo-yeon.

As of 2020, she was signed to Big Picture Entertainment.

Personal life

Bullying controversy
In 2017, a former T-ara staff member stated that Ryu and her sister were the bullies in the scandal that plagued T-ara in 2012. The reports featured a picture of an alleged text conversation between Ryu and Areum, T-ara's member at the time, in which Ryu threatened Areum with comments such as "I'll scratch up your face so you can't be on TV" and "Stupid bitch. Show up in front of me, we'll see what happens." Following this, viewers demanded that Ryu step down from her TV series Golden Pouch.

Discography

Filmography

Television series

Variety show

Music video appearances

Awards and nominations

References

1993 births
Living people
MBK Entertainment artists
People from Gwangju
South Korean women rappers
K-pop singers
South Korean female idols
Identical twins
South Korean twins
Twin musicians
South Korean television actresses
21st-century South Korean women singers
21st-century South Korean singers
21st-century South Korean actresses
Ryu clan of Munhwa